JS Aki (AOS-5203) is a Hibiki-class ocean surveillance ship of Japan Maritime Self-Defense Force.

Development and design 
Each vessel has a crew of 40, including five American civilian technicians, and a flight deck for helicopters to operate off of. They are able to deploy on station for 90 days.

The vessels have an AN/UQQ-2 Surveillance Towed Array Sensor System (SURTASS), which is installed in the United States. Data from the sensors is relayed through the Defense Satellite Communications System, and processed and shared with the United States. The data is fed into the Integrated Undersea Surveillance System.

Propulsion is provided by four Mitsubishi S6U-MPTK diesel electric engines.

Construction and career
Aki was laid down in October 2018 at Mitsui Engineering & Shipbuilding, Tamano and launched on 15 January 2020. She was commissioned on 4 March 2021.

References

2020 ships
Hibiki-class ocean surveillance ships
Ships built by Mitsui Engineering and Shipbuilding